Lieutenant General Hamid Nawaz Khan, HI(M), was a career Pakistan Army general who served as Interior Minister of Pakistan from November 2007 to April 2008 and Defence Secretary of Pakistan from 2001 to 2005. He also held the positions of chairman at Pakistan International Airlines, the Civil Aviation Authority and the Fauji Foundation.

He was the nephew of Chaudhry Naseer Ahmad Malhi from his father's side, one of the founders of Pakistan and the First Education Minister of Pakistan. His family is a part of the Sivia Jatt community.

Education and Army Career 
Nawaz Khan was a commerce graduate with honours from Punjab University and a M.Sc. in War Studies from Quaid-i-Azam University. He was commissioned in the Army Artillery Corps in 1966 as a Butt Shikan, in the 28th medium ARTY Punjab Regiment in which he served for 34 years. He commanded a Helicopter Squadron, Wing, Group and Regiment (II Corps Aviation Regiment between 1986 and 1989).

He was the chief of staff in a Corps Headquarters and Instructor in Command and Staff College in Quetta and National Defence University, Islamabad. He commanded the 33rd Infantry Division in Quetta for three years (1995–1998), served as Chief Instructor of Armed Forces War College at the then National Defense College (1998–2000). He was then promoted to Lieutenant General in March 2000 and posted as the Vice Chief of the General Staff (VCGS) from where he retired in March 2001.

Awards and recognition
 Hilal-i-Imtiaz (Crescent of Excellence) Award by the President of Pakistan.

References

External links 
Profile at National Police Bureau website

2014 deaths
Pakistani generals
Interior ministers of Pakistan
Defence Secretaries of Pakistan
Year of birth missing
Quaid-i-Azam University alumni
University of the Punjab alumni
Academic staff of the National Defence University, Pakistan
Pakistani MNAs 1977
Pakistani MNAs 1988–1990
Recipients of Hilal-i-Imtiaz